Renee Garing (born 4 September 1988) is an Australian rules footballer with the Geelong Football Club in the AFL Women's (AFLW).

Garing was recruited directly from Geelong's VFL Women's team prior to the club's inaugural season in the AFLW. Prior to playing Australian rules football, she played netball with St Mary's–winning the league's best and fairest award three times. Garing made her AFLW debut during the first round of the 2019 season, against Collingwood at GMHBA Stadium. As well as playing football, Garing is a physical education teacher and is married to her husband, Tony.

References

External links 

Geelong Football Club (AFLW) players
1988 births
Living people
Australian rules footballers from Victoria (Australia)
Sportswomen from Victoria (Australia)